Orinoeme rubricollis is a species of beetle in the family Cerambycidae. It was described by William John Macleay in 1886.

References

R
Beetles described in 1886